Carolina Ramírez is a Colombian actress. She is best known for her roles in television as La hija del mariachi, and her historical character Policarpa Salavarrieta in La Pola.

Personal life 
Carolina was born on June 20, 1983, in Cali, Colombia. She has been married since 2010 to Argentine businessman Mariano Bacaleinik.

Filmography

References

External links 
 

Living people
21st-century Colombian actresses
Colombian actresses
Colombian telenovela actresses
Colombian television actresses
Year of birth missing (living people)